Özlü can refer to the following villages in Turkey:

 Özlü, Antalya
 Özlü, İliç
 Özlü, Mut
 Özlü, Orta